John Adam Day (6 July 1901 – 7 June 1966), was a British Liberal Party parliamentary candidate who later became a prominent Conservative in Devon local government.

Background
He was the son of Herbert Allen Day and Isabella Maud Black. He was educated at Bedales School and the London School of Economics. He married, in 1932, Kathleen Emily Hebditch. They had one son and one daughter. He was a Hereditary Freeman of the City of Norwich.

Career
He was appointed a County Magistrate for Devon in 1938. He served in the Royal Air Force from 1940 to 1944. He was a Flight Lieutenant and Deputy Assistant Provost Marshal in charge of Cornwall. He was invalided out in 1944.

Political career
He was Liberal candidate for the Bury St Edmunds Division of Suffolk at the 1924 General Election. This was a safe Conservative seat that the Liberals had not contested since before 1918;

He was Liberal candidate for the Thornbury Division of Gloucestershire at the 1929 General Election. This was a more promising seat that the Liberals had last won in 1923;

He was Liberal candidate for the Tavistock Division of Devon at the 1931 General Election. He was hoping to take the seat from the Conservatives who had narrowly held the seat since taking it from the Liberals in 1924. At an election in which both main contenders claimed to be supporters of the National Government, the Conservative hung on; 

He was elected a Member of Devon County Council in 1932. He was again Liberal candidate for the Tavistock Division of Devon at the 1935 General Election, again without success;

He was Treasurer of the Devon & Cornwall Liberal Federation.

Civic career
He was elected an Alderman of Devon County Council in 1947. He served as Vice-Chairman of the Devon County Council Education Committee 1947–55. He served as Chairman of the Devon County Council Children's Committee 1948–55. He served as Sheriff of Devon, 1949–50. He served as Vice-Chairman of Devon County Council from 1955 to 1965. He served as Chairman of the Devon County Council Finance Committee 1956–65. He was Chairman of Torquay Division Conservative Association 1961–63. He served as Chairman of the Devon Community Council in 1962. He served as Chairman of Devon County Council from 1965 to 1966. He was a Member of the Economic Planning Council for the South West from 1965 to 1966.

References

1901 births
1966 deaths
Liberal Party (UK) parliamentary candidates
Conservative Party (UK) councillors
People educated at Bedales School
Alumni of the London School of Economics
Royal Air Force personnel of World War II
Place of birth missing
Place of death missing
Members of Devon County Council